is a Japanese webtoon series written and illustrated by Kometokaite Meter, and published by Comico Japan.

Characters

Main Characters

Others

References

External links 

Japanese webtoons
Webtoons in print
2013 manga
2015 anime television series debuts
2010s webtoons
Anime series based on manga
Manga adapted into television series
Surreal comedy anime and manga
Television shows based on Japanese webtoons